Diego Nicolás Cristin (born 5 April 1981) is a former professional tennis player from Argentina.

Biography
A right-handed player, Cristin comes from the Núñez neighbourhood of Buenos Aires.

Cristin was known for his fast serve, once registering 214 km/h while still a teenager, surpassing the fastest serve of any other Argentine player at that time.

In 2003 he had the distinction of being the first player to beat future US Open winner Juan Martín del Potro in a professional match, which he did at a local satellite tournament.

He was unable to break into the ATP Tour, featuring only as high as Challenger level. As a doubles player he made the world's top 200 and won a Challenger tournament in Santiago in 2009, partnering Eduardo Schwank.

Challenger titles

Doubles: (1)

References

External links
 
 

1981 births
Living people
Argentine male tennis players
Tennis players from Buenos Aires
21st-century Argentine people